Milan Pršo (born 29 June 1990) is a Serbian footballer who plays as a midfielder.

Career
Pršo played in youth categories of FK Crvena zvezda but he never played for their senior side. In 2008, he started his senior career with FK Rad. In the winter of 2014 he moved to the Serbian First League club Bežanija, and stayed with them for the rest of the season.

Personal life
Pršo is ethnic Serb, born in Knin, raised in Obrovac, at the time Yugoslavia (now Croatia). After Operation Storm (4–7 August 1995), when the family fled Obrovac, they arrived in Belgrade, the capital of Serbia. His paternal uncle is former Croatian footballer Dado Pršo. He has declined call-ups to the Croatian national team, stating that he "only will perform for Serbia".

References

External links
 
 

1990 births
Living people
Sportspeople from Knin
Serbs of Croatia
Serbian footballers
Serbia youth international footballers
Association football midfielders
FK Rad players
FK Bežanija players
Serbian SuperLiga players
Yugoslav Wars refugees
Croatian emigrants to Serbia